Fairview Presbyterian Church is a historic church listed on the National Register of Historic Places near Fountain Inn, South Carolina. The present two-story building, constructed in 1858 in the Greek Revival style, was the fourth building constructed by the church, which was founded in 1786.

The building is in nearly original condition. It features white clapboard siding, a tin roof, a pedimented portico and five square masonry front columns constructed from brick reclaimed from the previous church building. The pulpit and pews are original.

References

Presbyterian churches in South Carolina
Churches on the National Register of Historic Places in South Carolina
Churches completed in 1858
19th-century Presbyterian church buildings in the United States
Churches in Greenville County, South Carolina
National Register of Historic Places in Greenville County, South Carolina